Burn The Sky Down is the debut studio album by Australian singer Emma Hewitt, released on May 18, 2012.

The album was produced by Lee Groves, who created "... the ambient soundscapes [the team was] looking for ...".

On July 27, 2012, a separate remix album was released titled, Burn the Sky Down (The Remixes). Some of the remixers on the album include Armin van Buuren, Cosmic Gate, tyDi, Morgan Page, Shogun, Arnej, Matt Darey, Ivan Gough, and Jerome Isma-Ae.

Track listing

Charts

Peak positions

References

2012 debut albums
Armada Music albums